Piraeus Bank Tower is a large office building located in the city of Bucharest, Romania. The Romanian headquarters of the Greek Piraeus Bank is located in this building.

References

Skyscraper office buildings in Bucharest
Office buildings completed in 2009
Bank buildings in Romania